Camellia crapnelliana, Crapnell's camellia, is a flowering Camellia native to Hong Kong and other parts of south-eastern China.

In 1903, the species was first collected and described by W. J. Tutcher from Mount Parker, Hong Kong; only one plant was found at that time.

Description

Distribution
It is distributed in Hong Kong on in Mount Parker, and in Mau Ping on Ma On Shan peak. It is also distributed in Guangxi, Fujian, Zhejiang in China.

Uses
The seed oil is edible.

Camellia crapnelliana was introduced to Japan in 1968. Only a small number of plants have been cultivated in Japan because grafting on Camellia japonica or Camellia sasanqua is difficult.

Conservation
In Hong Kong, Camellia crapnelliana is a protected species under Forestry Regulations Cap. 96A.

References

External links

crapnelliana
Flora of Hong Kong
Trees of China
Vulnerable plants